Year 1453 (MCDLIII) was a common year starting on Monday of the Julian calendar, the 1453rd year of the Common Era (CE) and Anno Domini (AD) designations, the 453rd year of the 2nd millennium, the 53rd year of the 15th century, and the 4th year of the 1450s decade.
It is sometimes cited as the notional end of the Middle Ages by historians who define the medieval period as the time between the Fall of the Western Roman Empire and the fall of the Eastern Roman Empire, due to the Fall of Constantinople.

Events 
 January–December 
 April – Tarabya and Studius are taken by the Ottoman Empire, in preparation for the assault on Constantinople, as are the Prince Islands, by the Ottoman fleet under Admiral Baltaoglu.
 
 April 6–May 29 – Siege and Fall of Constantinople: The Ottoman Sultan Mehmed the Conqueror puts a decisive final end to the Roman Empire, nearly one and a half thousand years after its foundation by Augustus, by capturing the capital, Constantinople. Mortars are (perhaps) used in battle for the first time in this action. The consequent closure of the traditional overland route from Western Europe to the Far East, and need to identify new maritime routes, leads to the Age of Discovery, and ends the Middle Ages.
 May 22 – May 1453 lunar eclipse, a partial eclipse, is visible during the siege of Constantinople.
 
 July 17 – Battle of Castillon: In the last pitched battle of the Hundred Years' War, the French under Jean Bureau defeat the English under the Earl of Shrewsbury, who is killed.
 July 23 – Battle of Gavere in Flanders: Philip the Good, Duke of Burgundy, is victorious over the rebels of Ghent, leading to surrender of their city and the end of the Revolt of Ghent.
 October 19 – The French recapture Bordeaux, ending the Hundred Years' War and leaving the English retaining only Calais on French soil.
 October 28 – Ladislaus the Posthumous is crowned King of Bohemia, although George of Poděbrady remains in control of the government.
 November 10 – Sejo of Joseon kills his enemy General Kim Jong-seo and gains control of the government in Joseon Korea (where this rebellion is called Gyeyujeongnan).

Births 
 January 1 – Bernardin Frankopan, Croatian nobleman, diplomat and soldier (d. 1529)
 February 6 – Girolamo Benivieni, Florentine poet (d. 1542)
 March 2 – Johannes Engel, German doctor, astronomer and astrologer (d. 1512)
 March 3 – Philip II, Count of Waldeck-Eisenberg (1486–1524) (d. 1524)
 March 25 – Giuliano de' Medici, co-ruler of Florence with Lorenzo de' Medici (d. 1478)
 April 18 – Margaret of Brandenburg, abbess of the Poor Clares monastery at Hof (d. 1509)
 May 13 – Mary Stewart, Countess of Arran, Scottish princess (d. 1488)
 June 10 – Francesco Soderini, Catholic cardinal (d. 1524)
 September 1 – Gonzalo Fernández de Córdoba, Spanish general and statesman (d. 1515)
 October 13 – Edward of Westminster, Prince of Wales (d. 1471)
 November 13 – Christoph I, Margrave of Baden-Baden (1475–1515) (d. 1527)
 November 17 – Alfonso, Prince of Asturias (d. 1468)
 date unknown – Jacob Obrecht, Flemish composer (d. 1505)
 probable – Afonso de Albuquerque, Portuguese admiral (d. 1515)

Deaths 
 February 28 – Isabella, Duchess of Lorraine (b. 1400)
 May 29
 Constantine XI Palaiologos, last Byzantine Emperor (b. 1405)
 Athanasius II of Constantinople, Ecumenical Patriarch of Constantinople
 Theophilos Palaiologos, Byzantine grammarian, humanist and mathematician. Cousin of Constantine XI.
 Demetrios Palaiologos Metochites, last governor of Constantinople
 Orhan Çelebi, Ottoman prince (b. 1412)
 June 1
 Çandarli Halil Pasha, Ottoman grand vizier
 Giovanni Giustiniani, Italian captain
 June 2 – Álvaro de Luna, Duke of Trujillo, Constable of Castille
 June 3 – Loukas Notaras, last megas doux of the Byzantine Empire (b. 1402)
 June 4 – Andronikos Palaiologos Kantakouzenos, last Grand Domestic of the Byzantine Empire
 July 17
 Dmitry Shemyaka, Grand Prince of Moscow
 John Talbot, 1st Earl of Shrewsbury, English military leader
 July 20 – Enguerrand de Monstrelet, French chronicler
 October 13 – Jacob, Margrave of Baden-Baden (1431-1453) (b. 1407)
 October 20 – Yi Jing-ok, Korean military General (b. 1399)
 December 24 – John Dunstaple, English composer (b. 1390)
 Demetrius III, former co-king of Georgia (b. c. 1413)

References